Giuseppe Siri (20 May 1906 – 2 May 1989) was an Italian cardinal of the Catholic Church who served as Archbishop of Genoa from 1946 to 1987, and was elevated to the rank of cardinal in 1953. He was a protege of Pope Pius XII. He was considered a likely candidate to succeed Pius XII, John XXIII, Paul VI, and John Paul I.

Early life and ministry
Siri was born in Genoa to Nicolò and Giulia (née Bellavista) Siri. He entered the minor seminary of Genoa on 16 October 1916, and attended the major seminary from 1917 to 1926. Siri then studied at the Pontifical Gregorian University in Rome, and was ordained to the priesthood by Archbishop Carlo Minoretti on 22 September 1928. Finishing his studies at the Gregorian, he earned his doctorate in theology summa cum laude and also did pastoral work in Rome until autumn 1929.

Upon returning to Genoa, he served as a chaplain until he became a professor of dogmatic theology at the major seminary in 1930, also teaching fundamental theology for a year. In addition to his academic duties, Siri was a preacher, public speaker, and professor of religion at the classical lyceums named to Andrea Doria and Giuseppe Mazzini from 1931 to 1936. He was named prosynodal examiner in the archdiocesan curia in 1936 and rector of Collegio Teologico S. Tommaso d'Aquino in 1937.

Episcopal career

On 14 March 1944, Siri was appointed Auxiliary Bishop of Genoa and Titular Bishop of Livias by Pope Pius XII. He received his episcopal consecration on the following 7 May from Cardinal Pietro Boetto at the St. Lawrence Cathedral. He became vicar general for the archdiocese on 8 September 1944. During his tenure as an auxiliary, he was a member of the Italian resistance movement in World War II. He negotiated with the Nazi forces surrounding Genoa and met secretly with partisan leaders, eventually arranging a Nazi surrender that avoided further bombardment of the city.

Following the death of Cardinal Boetto, Siri was named Archbishop of Genoa on 14 May 1946, and installed on 29 May of that year. Pius XII created him Cardinal-Priest of Santa Maria della Vittoria, Rome, in the consistory of 12 January 1953. At the time of his elevation, he was the youngest member of the College of Cardinals. He became known as the "minestrone cardinal" for his relief work in soup kitchens.

Siri was noted for his staunchly conservative views. At the Second Vatican Council (1962–1965), he sat on its Board of Presidency and, alongside Archbishop Marcel Lefebvre and Cardinals Alfredo Ottaviani and Thomas Cooray, he was part of the association of traditionalist Council fathers named Coetus Internationalis Patrum. However, Siri once said, "I would describe myself as an independent, a man who walks alone and is not a member of any group." He was opposed to collegiality and innovation.

Pope John XXIII named Siri the first president of the Italian Episcopal Conference on 12 October 1959. He remained in that post until 1965. Siri, who had voted in the conclaves of 1958 and 1963, was also one of the cardinal electors in the August and October 1978 conclaves. He was a strong candidate for the papacy, or papabile, in all four conclaves, in which his support lay mostly with Curialists and other conservative cardinals. Media reports suggested that Siri in fact topped the first count of votes in the August 1978 conclave before losing to Albino Luciani, who became Pope John Paul I. Following John Paul I's death, Siri was the leading conservative candidate in opposition to Cardinal Giovanni Benelli, the Archbishop of Florence and leading liberal candidate. Vaticanologists suggested that the eventual winner, Cardinal Wojtyła, who became Pope John Paul II, was chosen as a compromise candidate between the two. Shortly afterwards, Siri implied that he disapproved of Wojtyła's election.

In a biography of Siri, Nicla Buonasorte reports that Siri was a friend of Archbishop Marcel Lefebvre, but disapproved of his reported schismatic activities. But even until the last minute, Siri begged him ("on his knees") not to break with Rome. In the end, Siri resigned himself to the inevitability of his friend's excommunication.
Buonasorte commented: "In all probability, it is due to Siri that Lefebvre had no significant following in Italy".

The same book indicates that Siri seemed to have turned a blind eye to the assistance given by one or two of his clergy to members of the German National Socialist Party, including Adolf Eichmann, fleeing to South America after the Second World War. The author stresses, however, that this was out of compassion for people in difficulties, and completely unconnected with his well-known conservative views. Siri during the war had supported Christian-Democrat Italian resistance financially and morally. He also aided and sheltered some of his priests who tried to help rescue threatened Jews to safety in Franco's neutral Spain. 

Siri reached age 80 in 1986 and thus lost the right to participate in future conclaves; he was the last remaining cardinal elector who had been elevated by Pope Pius XII. Siri resigned from his post in Genoa on 6 July 1987, after 41 years of service. He died in Villa Campostano, Genoa, at age 82, and was buried at San Lorenzo metropolitan cathedral in Genoa.

Conclave speculation

Siri was considered a strong candidate in the 1958 papal conclave held to elect a successor to replace Pius XII On the evening of 26 October, the first day of the conclave, apparent white smoke was seen coming from the chimney of the Sistine Chapel, a traditional signal to the crowds in the square outside that a pope has been elected. No announcement was made, however, and after about half an hour, the smoke turned black, indicating that there was no result. Vatican Radio corrected its report.

Sometime in the late 1980s, an American traditionalist Catholic named Gary Giuffre began to expound the belief that Siri was the true pope, and that he was held captive in a monastery in Rome. According to Giuffre and his followers, the white smoke that was seen on 26 October 1958 did indeed mean that a pope had been elected, and that pope was Siri, but Siri was forced to reject the papacy because of threats from outside the conclave. Roncalli, who they claimed was a Freemason, was elected instead as Pope John XXIII. It was also claimed that this occurred during the 1963 conclave that elected Giovanni Battista Montini  as Pope Paul VI.

Siri himself never made these claims, and accepted the authority of all popes in his lifetime. He was appointed president of the Italian Episcopal Conference by Pope John in 1959, and remained in the post under Pope Paul until 1964. He was a candidate for pope in the 1978 conclave that followed the death of Paul VI, where he is thought to have led in the early ballot, but the conclave eventually elected Albino Luciani as Pope John Paul I, and again two months later in the October 1978 conclave, where he is also thought to have come within a few votes of election before the eventual election of Karol Wojtyła as Pope John Paul II. Siri never made any reference to the "Siri thesis", nor was there any mention of it in his New York Times obituary, in the biography written by Raimondo Spiazzi, or in a speech given by Giulio Andreotti on the centenary of Siri's birth in 2006.

See also
Cardinal electors in Papal conclave, 1958
Cardinal electors in Papal conclave, 1963
Cardinal electors in Papal conclaves, August and October 1978

References

Sources

External links

 Cardinals of the Holy Roman Church
 Main website propounding the Siri Theory
 Book, "Mio Padre" (My Father) By Giuseppe Siri, 1975 in English. 
 Discussions about the Siri Theory
 

1906 births
1989 deaths
Cardinals created by Pope Pius XII
20th-century Italian cardinals
Roman Catholic archbishops of Genoa
20th-century Italian Roman Catholic archbishops
Italian resistance movement members
Participants in the Second Vatican Council
Coetus Internationalis Patrum
Pontifical Gregorian University alumni
Italian anti-communists
Anti-Masonry
Livias